Fagnano may refer to

Fagnano Alto, a comune in Abruzzo, Italy
Fagnano Castello, a comune in Calabria, Italy
Fagnano Olona, a comune in Lombardy, Italy
Lake Fagnano, in Tierra del Fuego, South America

People with the surname
Giulio Carlo de' Toschi di Fagnano (1682–1766), Italian nobleman and mathematician
Giovanni Fagnano (1715–1797), Italian churchman and mathematician, Giulio's son

Italian-language surnames